High There is a 2014 dark, nonfiction comedy film about a real-life, legendary but down-and-out tabloid television journalist who heads to Hawaii to film a marijuana travel series, only to become lost in a fog of drugs, sex and paranoia as he uncovers a secret government war to control the marijuana trade. The film touches on the controversial federal prosecution of marijuana advocate Roger Christie and his THC Ministry.

The film was released on DVD and Video on Demand by BrinkVision distribution on 23 June 2015.

The film was the Opening Selection of the first annual Cannabis Film Festival in Garberville, Humboldt County, California (known as the capital of marijuana farming) in May 2015, and won the festival's Viewers' Choice Award.

The film is directed by veteran tabloid journalist and television producer Wayne Darwen and videographer Henry Goren.  The pair star in the film in the roles of Dave High and Roland Jointz, respectively.  Darwen wrote the script.  Darwen and Goren are credited as producers, along with award-winning television producer and documentary film director and producer Burt Kearns.

High There is a Sam Peters International Productions Unlimited and Good Story Productions presentation of a Rat Lung picture.

History 
A brief trailer that was posted on YouTube racked up more than 1.5 million views, while Darwen's appearance as Dave High on TheLipTV.com's Buzzsaw with Tyrel Ventura podcast shattered previous download records.  Darwen has been cited as the inspiration for Robert Downey Jr.'s character Wayne Gale in Oliver Stone's film Natural Born Killers and has been called the "new" Hunter S. Thompson.

On 8 August 2014, High There was named an official selection of the 2014 Action on Film International Film Festival.  The festival in Monrovia, California hosted the premiere of the film on 25 August 2014.

Reviews
In advance of its release, High There received excellent reviews from publications across the globe, including The Australian, LA Weekly, the Anchorage Press (Alaska), and The Huffington Post.

Additional favorable reviews followed the film's release.

Cast

Wayne Darwen
Henry Goren
E Girl
Alien Tom
Tony The Healer
Bala The Coconut Boy
LeAnn The Tile Lady
Mrs. Bates
Daryl
Andrea
Deep Shit
Surfer Dave
Hammerhead
Share Christie
Roseanne Barr (uncredited)

References

External links

New York Post article on film and director
Marijuana documentary proves that truth can indeed be stranger than fiction
High There movie website 
High There press materials and media site
Documentary Dude: An interview with Wayne Darwen, writer/director of High There
Documentary Dude: An interview with Burt Kearns, producer of High There
PageSix.com: High There director takes on Robert Downey, Jr.
PageSix.com: Tommy Chong passes the cannabis comedy torch to High There’s Wayne Darwen

2014 films
2014 documentary films
2010s English-language films